The Curse of Muldoon, named after Pete Muldoon, was a sports-related curse that supposedly prevented the Chicago Black Hawks of the National Hockey League from finishing in first place between 1927 and 1967.

History

The Hawks' first season, 1926–27, was a moderate success, with the forward line of Mickey MacKay, Babe Dye, and Dick Irvin each finishing near the top of the league's scoring race. The Hawks lost their 1927 first-round playoff series to the Boston Bruins. Following this series, team owner Frederic McLaughlin fired head coach Pete Muldoon.

Jim Coleman, a sportswriter for The Globe and Mail wrote in 1943 that the reason for Muldoon's firing boiled down to a heated end-of-season argument with McLaughlin. As the story goes, McLaughlin felt that the Black Hawks were good enough to finish first in the American Division. Muldoon disagreed, and McLaughlin fired him. Muldoon supposedly responded, "Fire me, Major, and you'll never finish first. I'll put a curse on this team that will hoodoo it until the end of time." At the time, finishing in first place was considered to be as much of an achievement as winning the Stanley Cup. While the team would win the Stanley Cup in 1934 (defeating the Detroit Red Wings in the Finals), 1938 (defeating the Toronto Maple Leafs) and 1961 (again defeating the Red Wings), they would do so without having finished in first place either in a multi-division or a single-league format.

In 1967, the last season of the six-team NHL, the Hawks finished first, breaking the supposed Curse of Muldoon, 23 years after the death of McLaughlin.  Afterward, sportswriter Jim Coleman, who first printed the story of the curse in 1943, admitted that he made the story up to break a writer's block he had as a deadline approached.

References

External links
 Mention of the Curse on the Blackhawks' website
 Holzman, Morey. "Blackhawks: Cursed, or Concoction?" The New York Times, Sunday, May 30, 2010.

Curses
Sports-related curses
History of the Chicago Blackhawks